The Bahawalpur church shooting was a mass shooting at Saint Dominic's Church in Bahawalpur, Punjab, Pakistan on 28 October 2001 by six assailants belonging to Lashkar-e-Jhangvi. The guard of the church and 17 other Christians were killed.

Background 

Non-Muslims are targeted in Pakistan by extremists. Since Pakistan backed the United States in the 2001 invasion of Afghanistan, terrorists are targeting Pakistani minorities, especially Christians.

Shooting 
Six masked gunmen riding on three motorcycles bring out their AK 47 riffles which they were hiding in their bags and started shooting. At the time, around 100 people were inside church. They first killed the guard of the church at the gate and then entered the church and started firing on worshippers. While shooting, they were chanting slogans, "Afghanistan and Pakistan, graveyard of Christians" and were also chanting "Allah hu Akbar" (God is Great). They fired for 3 minutes, from 08:52 to 08:55 (UTC + 0:500). The assault left 18 people dead.

Reactions 
The President of Pakistan, Pervez Musharraf said that he was saddened by killing of Christians and accused trained extremists of the attack.

Two days after the attack, police launched a crackdown and captured 22 suspects. On 28 July 2002, 4 suspects belonging from Lashkar-e-Jhangvi who admitted to have committed the crime, were killed in an ambush.

See also 
 List of terrorist incidents in Pakistan since 2001
 2019 Ghotki riots
 2014 Larkana temple attack
 2009 Gojra riots

References 

 
2001 murders in Pakistan
2001 mass shootings in Asia
2000s crimes in Punjab, Pakistan
21st-century mass murder in Pakistan
Attacks on buildings and structures in 2001
Attacks on buildings and structures in Punjab, Pakistan
Attacks on churches in Asia
Attacks on religious buildings and structures in Pakistan
Church shooting
Islamic terrorism in Pakistan
Islamic terrorist incidents in 2001
Islamist attacks on churches
Lashkar-e-Jhangvi attacks
Mass murder in 2001
Mass murder in Punjab, Pakistan
Mass shootings in Pakistan
Massacres in religious buildings and structures
October 2001 crimes
October 2001 events in Pakistan
Persecution of Christians in Pakistan
Terrorist incidents in Pakistan in 2001
Terrorist incidents in Punjab, Pakistan
Church shooting